Longitarsus violentus is a species of beetle in the subfamily Galerucinae that can be found in Azerbaijan, Georgia, Russian territories such as Buriatia and Dagestan, and in West China.

References

V
Beetles described in 1893
Beetles of Asia
Taxa named by Julius Weise